South of Caliente  is a 1951 American Western film directed by William Witney and starring Roy Rogers.

One highlight of the film is the gypsy dance as done by Lillian Molieri (aka Lupe Mayorga). Her husband Francisco Mayorga worked with Roy in "Hands Across The Border." and her young adopted son, (Later to be a Hall of Fame Guitarist) Bill Aken did a vocal duet with Roy on the song "The Big Silver Screen" in 1959. A unique two generation family association in which all three family members appeared with Roy Rogers.

Plot

Cast

References

External links
 
 
 
 

1951 films
1951 Western (genre) films
American black-and-white films
American Western (genre) films
Films directed by William Witney
1950s English-language films
1950s American films